Krzysztof Stanek is an observational astrophysicist and Professor and University Distinguished Scholar at Ohio State University. He was named a University Distinguished Scholar in 2018. His research focus is on the explosive deaths of massive stars.

In 2022, Stanek was awarded a Guggenheim Fellowship. He won the Beatrice M. Tinsley Prize along with Christopher Kochanek in 2020 for their work on the All-Sky Automated Survey for Supernovae (ASAS-SN) project. He is a Fellow of the American Association for the Advancement of Science. He has also been the recipient of a Harvard-Smithsonian CfA Postdoctoral Fellowship, the Polish Astronomical Society Young Astronomer Award and a Hubble Postdoctoral Fellowship.

Selected articles

Books

References 

Ohio State University faculty
American people of Polish descent
Fellows of the American Association for the Advancement of Science
Living people
Year of birth missing (living people)